Manú Province is one of three provinces in the Madre de Dios Region of Peru. The capital of Manú province is the city of Salvación.

Political division
The province is divided into four districts, each of which is headed by a mayor (alcalde):

See also
 Manú River
 Manú National Park
 Amarakaeri Communal Reserve

References

Provinces of the Madre de Dios Region